Dictis is a genus of spitting spiders that was first described by Ludwig Carl Christian Koch in 1872.

Species
 it contains four species, found in Asia, Oceania, North America and Seychelles:
Dictis elongata Dankittipakul & Singtripop, 2010 – Thailand
Dictis soeur (Saaristo, 1997) – Seychelles
Dictis striatipes L. Koch, 1872 (type) – Yemen, United Arab Emirates, Iran, tropical Asia, Korea, Japan, China to Australia, Pacific Isles. Introduced to USA, Mexico
Dictis thailandica Dankittipakul & Singtripop, 2010 – Thailand

See also
 List of Scytodidae species

References

Araneomorphae genera
Scytodidae
Spiders of Asia
Spiders of Australia
Taxa named by Ludwig Carl Christian Koch